Shani Bakanov (Hebrew: שני בקאנוב; born 27 February 2006) is an Israeli rhythmic gymnast. She won gold in the group All-Around at the 2022 European Championship and silver in the same category at the 2022 World Championships.

Career 
Bakanov began the sport at age four at the Maccabi Haifa Carmel club in Israel.

In 2021 Shani was part of the junior group along Eliza Banchuk, Alona Hillel, Emili Malka and Simona Rudnik, that won bronze in the All-Around and with 5 ribbons at the European Championships in Varna.

In 2022 she was named part of Israel's new national group, they debuted at the World Cup in Athens, winning gold in 5 hoops and 3 ribbons + 2 balls. Then Baku, where they got bronze in the All-Around and 5 hoops. Pamplona (All-Around silver), Portimão (All-Around gold) and Cluj-Napoca (All-Around and 5 hoops silver).

In June she participated in the European Championships in Tel Aviv, where the group won the All-Around and got silver with 5 hoops as well as the bronze medal in the senior team category along with teammates Adar Friedmann, Amit Hedvat, Romi Paritzki, Ofir Shaham, Diana Svertsov and the individuals Daria Atamanov and Adi Asya Katz.

In September Shani took part in the World Championships in Sofia along Adar Friedmann, Romi Paritzki, Ofir Shaham and Diana Svertsov, winning two silver medals in the All-Around and the 5 hoops' final. Despite being among the favourites for a team medal, Israel couldn't take part in the competition because Atamanov broke her foot the day before the competition started and, as replacements had to be announced at least 24 hours before competition, leaving the country with only Katz as individual.

References 

2006 births

Living people
Israeli rhythmic gymnasts
Medalists at the Rhythmic Gymnastics European Championships
Medalists at the Rhythmic Gymnastics World Championships